Ratko (Cyrillic script: Ратко) is a male given name of Slavic origin. It is a diminutive form of the names Ratibor and Ratimir.

Notable people

Ratko Čolić (1918–1999), Serbian footballer
Ratko Dautovski, Macedonian percussionist, interested in world percussion
Ratko Delorko (born 1959), German pianist, composer, producer and conductor
Ratko Đokić (1940–2003), Yugoslavian-Swedish mob boss, a leader of the so-called "Cigarette Mafia"
Ratko Dostanić (born 1959), Serbian football (soccer) head coach
Ratko Glavina (born 1941), Croatian actor
Ratko Janev (1939–2019), physicist
Ratko Kacian (1917–1949), Croatian footballer
Ratko Mladić (born 1942), Chief of Staff of the Bosnian Serb Army during the Bosnian War of 1992–1995
Ratko Nikolić (born 1977), Serbian handballer
Ratko Ninković (born 1967), football manager and former player from Bosnia-Herzegovina
Ratko Perić (born 1944), the Bishop of Mostar-Duvno and Apostolic Administrator of Trebinje-Mrkan
Ratko Radovanović (born 1956), basketball player
Ratko Rudić (born 1948), Croatian water polo coach
Ratko Stevović (born 1956), Montenegrin football manager
Ratko Štritof (born 1972), Croatian water polo player
Ratko Svilar (born 1950), former Serbian football goalkeeper
Ratko Vansimpsen (born 1989), Belgian footballer
Ratko Varda (born 1979), Serbian professional basketball player
Ratko Vujović (1916–1977), Montenegrin political activist and soldier

See also
Ratko: The Dictator's Son, 2009 film
Ratković (disambiguation)

Slavic masculine given names
Bosnian masculine given names
Croatian masculine given names
Czech masculine given names
Montenegrin masculine given names
Slovak masculine given names
Slovene masculine given names
Serbian masculine given names